This is a list of schools in Suffolk, England.

State-funded schools

Primary schools

 Abbots Green Primary Academy, Bury St Edmunds
 Abbot's Hall Community Primary School, Stowmarket
 Acton CE Primary School, Acton
 The Albert Pye Community Primary School, Beccles
 Aldeburgh Primary School, Aldeburgh
 All Saints CE Primary School, Newmarket
 All Saints CE Primary School, Laxfield
 All Saints CE Primary School, Lawshall
 Bacton Primary School, Bacton
 Bardwell CE Primary School, Bardwell
 Barnby and North Cove Community Primary School, Barnby
 Barnham CE Primary School, Barnham 
 Barningham CE Primary School, Barningham
 Barrow CE Primary School, Barrow
 Bawdsey CE Primary School, Bawdsey
 Bealings School, Little Bealings
 Beaumont Community Primary School, Hadleigh
 Beccles Primary Academy, Beccles
 Beck Row Primary Academy, Beck Row
 Bedfield CE Primary School, Bedfield
 The Beeches Community Primary School, Ipswich
 Benhall St Mary's CE Primary School, Benhall
 Bentley CE Primary School, Bentley
 Bildeston Primary School, Bildeston
 Birchwood Primary School, Martlesham Heath
 Blundeston CE Primary School, Blundeston
 Bosmere Community Primary School, Needham Market
 Boxford CE Primary School, Boxford
 Bramfield CE Primary School, Bramfield
 Bramford CE Primary School, Bramford
 Brampton CE Primary School, Brampton
 Britannia Primary School, Ipswich
 Broke Hall Community Primary School, Ipswich
 Brooklands Primary School, Brantham
 Bucklesham Primary School, Bucklesham
 Bungay Primary School, Bungay
 Bures CE Primary School, Bures St. Mary
 Burton End Primary Academy, Haverhill
 Castle Hill Junior & Infant School
 Capel St Mary CE Primary School, Capel St Mary
 Carlton Colville Primary School, Carlton Colville
 Castle Hill Infant School, Ipswich
 Castle Hill Junior School, Ipswich
 Cavendish CE Primary School, Cavendish
 Cedars Park Community Primary School, Stowmarket
 Cedarwood Primary School, Kesgrave
 Charsfield CE Primary School, Charsfield
 Chelmondiston CE Primary School, Chelmondiston
 Chilton Community Primary School, Stowmarket
 Clare Community Primary School, Clare
 Claydon Primary School, Claydon
 Clements Primary Academy, Haverhill
 Cliff Lane Primary School, Ipswich
 Clifford Road Primary School, Ipswich
 Cockfield CE Primary School, Cockfield
 Coldfair Green Community Primary School, Knodishall
 Colneis Junior School, Felixtowe
 Combs Ford Primary School, Stowmarket
 Copdock Primary School, Copdock
 Corton CE Primary School, Corton
 Coupals Primary Academy, Haverhill
 Crawford's CE Primary School, Haughley
 Creeting St Mary CE Primary School, Creeting St Mary
 Dale Hall Community Primary School, Ipswich
 Dell Primary School, Oulton Broad
 Dennington CE Primary School, Dennington
 Earl Soham Community Primary School, Earl Soham
 East Bergholt CE Primary School, East Bergholt
 Easton Primary School, Easton
 Edgar Sewter Community Primary School, Halesworth
 Elm Tree Community Primary School, Lowestoft
 Elmsett CE Primary School, Elmsett
 Elmswell Community Primary School, Elmswell
 Elveden CE Primary Academy, Elveden
 Exning Primary School, Exning
 Eyke CE Primary School, Eyke
 Fairfield Infant School, Felixstowe
 Forest Academy, Brandon
 Framlingham Sir Robert Hitcham's CE Primary School, Framlingham
 Freeman Community Primary School, Stowupland
 Fressingfield CE Primary School, Fressingfield
 Gislingham CE Primary School, Gislingham
 Glade Academy, Brandon
 Glemsford Primary Academy, Glemsford
 Gorseland Primary School, Martlesham Heath
 Grace Cook Primary School, Stowmarket
 Grange Community Primary School, Felixtowe
 Great Barton CE Primary Academy, Great Barton
 Great Finborough CE Primary School, Great Finborough
 Great Heath Academy, Mildenhall
 Great Waldingfield CE Primary School, Great Waldingfield
 Great Whelnetham CE Primary School, Great Whelnetham
 Grove Primary School, Carlton Colville
 Grundisburgh Primary School, Grundisburgh
 Guildhall Feoffment Community Primary School, Bury St Edmunds
 Gunton Primary Academy, Lowestoft
 Gusford Community Primary School, Ipswich
 Hadleigh Community Primary School, Hadleigh
 Halifax Primary School, Ipswich
 Handford Hall Primary School, Ipswich
 Hardwick Primary School, Bury St Edmunds
 Hartest CE Primary School, Hartest
 Heath Primary School, Kesgrave
 Helmingham Primary School, Helmingham
 Henley Primary School, Henley
 Hillside Primary School, Ipswich
 Hintlesham and Chattisham CE Primary School, Hintlesham
 Holbrook Primary School, Holbrook
 Hollesley Primary School, Hollesley
 Holton St Peter Community Primary School, Holton St Peter
 Honington CE Primary School, Honington
 Hopton CE Primary School, Hopton
 Houldsworth Valley Primary Academy, Newmarket
 Howard Primary School, Bury St Edmunds
 Hundon Community Primary School, Hundon
 Ickworth Park Primary School, Ickworth
 Ilketshall St Lawrence School, Ilketshall St Lawrence
 Ixworth CE Primary School, Ixworth
 Kedington Primary Academy, Kedington
 Kelsale CE Primary School, Kelsale
 Kersey CE Primary School, Kersey
 Kessingland CE Primary Academy, Kessingland
 Kingsfleet Primary School, Felixtowe
 Kyson Primary School, Woodbridge
 Lakenheath Community Primary School, Lakenheath
 Langer Primary Academy, Felixtowe
 Laureate Community Academy, Newmarket
 Lavenham Community Primary School, Lavenham
 Leiston Primary School, Leiston
 The Limes Primary Academy, Oulton
 Long Melford CE Primary School, Long Melford
 Martlesham Primary School, Martlesham
 Mellis CE Primary School, Mellis
 Melton Primary School, Melton
 Mendham Primary School, Mendham
 Mendlesham Primary School, Mendlesham
 Middleton Community Primary School, Middleton
 Morland CE Primary School, Ipswich
 Moulton CE Primary School, Moulton
 Murrayfield Primary Academy, Ipswich
 Nacton CE Primary School, Nacton
 Nayland Primary School, Nayland
 New Cangle Community Primary School, Haverhill
 Northfield St Nicholas Primary Academy, Lowestoft
 Norton CE Primary School, Norton
 The Oaks Primary School, Ipswich
 Occold Primary School, Occold
 Old Newton CE Primary School, Old Newton
 Orford CE Primary School, Orford
 Otley Primary School, Otley
 Oulton Broad Primary School, Oulton Broad
 Paddocks Primary School, Newmarket
 Pakefield Primary School, Pakefield
 Palgrave CE Primary School, Palgrave
 Phoenix St Peter Academy, Lowestoft
 The Pines Primary School, Red Lodge
 Piper's Vale Primary Academy, Ipswich
 Place Farm Primary Academy, Haverhill
 Poplars Community Primary School, Lowestoft
 Pot Kiln Primary School, Great Cornard
 Ranelagh Primary School, Ipswich
 Rattlesden CE Primary Academy, Rattlesden
 Ravensmere Infant School, Beccles
 Ravenswood Community Primary School, Ipswich
 Red Oak Primary School, Lowestoft
 Rendlesham Primary School, Rendlesham
 Reydon Primary School, Reydon
 Ringsfield CE Primary School, Ringsfield
 Ringshall School, Ringshall
 Risby CE Primary School, Risby
 Roman Hill Primary School, Lowestoft
 Rose Hill Primary, Ipswich
 Rougham CE Primary School, Rougham
 Rushmere Hall Primary School, Ipswich
 St Benet's RC Primary School, Beccles
 St Botolph's CE Primary School, Botesdale
 St Christopher's CE Primary School, Red Lodge
 St Edmund's RC Primary School, Bungay
 St Edmund's RC Primary School, Bury St Edmunds
 St Edmund's Primary School, Hoxne
 St Edmundsbury CE Primary School, Bury St Edmunds
 St Felix RC Primary School, Haverhill
 St Gregory CE Primary School, Sudbury
 St Helen's Primary School, Ipswich
 St John's CE Primary School, Ipswich
 St Joseph's RC Primary School, Sudbury
 St Louis RC Academy, Newmarket
 St Margaret's CE Primary School, Ipswich
 St Margaret's Primary Academy, Lowestoft
 St Mark's RC Primary School, Ipswich
 St Mary's CE Academy, Mildenhall
 St Mary's CE Primary School, Hadleigh
 St Mary's CE Primary School, Woodbridge
 St Mary's RC Primary School, Ipswich
 St Mary's RC Primary School, Lowestoft
 St Matthew's CE Primary School, Ipswich
 St Pancras RC Primary School, Ipswich
 St Peter and St Paul CE Primary School, Eye
 Sandlings Primary School, Sutton
 Saxmundham Primary School, Saxmundham
 Sebert Wood Community Primary School, Bury St Edmunds
 SET Felix Primary, Felixtowe
 Sexton's Manor Community Primary School, Bury St Edmunds
 Shotley Community Primary School, Shotley
 Sidegate Primary School, Ipswich
 Sir Robert Hitcham CE School, Debenham
 Snape Primary School, Snape
 Somerleyton Primary School, Somerleyton
 Somersham Primary School, Somersham
 Southwold Primary School, Southwold
 Springfield Infant School and Nursery, Ipswich
 Springfield Junior School, Ipswich
 Sprites Primary Academy, Ipswich
 Sproughton CE Primary School, Sproughton
 Stanton Community Primary School, Stanton
 Stoke-by-Nayland CE Primary School, Stoke-by-Nayland
 Stonham Aspal CE Primary School, Stonham Aspal
 Stradbroke CE Primary School, Stradbroke
 Stratford St Mary Primary School, Stratford St Mary
 Stutton CE Primary School, Stutton
 Tattingstone CE Primary School, Tattingstone
 Thorndon CE Primary School, Thorndon
 Thurlow CE Primary School, Little Thurlow
 Thurston CE Primary Academy, Thurston
 Tollgate Primary School, Bury St Edmunds
 Trimley St Martin Primary School, Trimley St Martin
 Trimley St Mary Primary School, Trimley St Mary
 Trinity CE Primary School, Combs
 Tudor CE Primary School, Sudbury
 Waldringfield Primary School, Waldringfield
 Walsham-le-Willows CE Primary School, Walsham le Willows
 Wells Hall Primary School, Great Cornard
 Wenhaston Primary School, Wenhaston
 West Row Academy, West Row
 Westfield Primary Academy, Haverhill
 Westgate Community Primary School, Bury St Edmunds
 Westwood Primary School, Lowestoft
 Wetheringsett CE Primary School, Wetheringsett
 Whatfield CE Primary School, Whatfield
 Whitehouse Community Primary School, Ipswich
 Wickham Market Primary School, Wickham Market
 Wickhambrook Primary Academy, Wickhambrook
 Wilby CE Primary School, Wilby
 The Willows Primary School, Ipswich
 Witnesham Primary School, Witnesham
 Wood Ley Community Primary School, Stowmarket
 Woodbridge Primary School, Woodbridge
 Woodhall Primary School, Sudbury
 Woods Loke Primary School, Oulton Broad
 Woolpit Primary Academy, Woolpit
 Worlingham CE Primary School, Worlingham
 Worlingworth CE Primary School, Worlingworth
 Wortham Primary School, Wortham
 Yoxford & Peasenhall Primary Academy, Yoxford

Middle schools
Horringer Court Middle School, Bury St Edmunds
Westley Middle School, Bury St Edmunds

Secondary schools

Alde Valley Academy, Leiston
Benjamin Britten Academy, Lowestoft
Breckland School, Brandon
Bungay High School, Bungay
Castle Manor Academy, Haverhill
Chantry Academy, Ipswich
Claydon High School, Ipswich
Copleston High School, Ipswich
County Upper School, Bury St Edmunds
Debenham High School, Debenham
East Bergholt High School, East Bergholt
East Point Academy Lowestoft
Farlingaye High School, Woodbridge
Felixstowe Academy, Felixstowe
Hadleigh High School, Hadleigh
Hartismere School, Eye
Holbrook Academy, Holbrook near Ipswich
Ipswich Academy, Ipswich
Kesgrave High School, Kesgrave
King Edward VI School, Bury St Edmunds
Mildenhall College Academy, Mildenhall
Newmarket Academy, Newmarket
Northgate High School, Ipswich
Ormiston Denes Academy, Lowestoft
Ormiston Endeavour Academy, Ipswich
Ormiston Sudbury Academy, Sudbury
Pakefield High School, Lowestoft
St Alban's Catholic High School, Ipswich
St Benedict's Catholic School, Bury St Edmunds
Samuel Ward Academy, Haverhill
SET Beccles School, Beccles
SET Ixworth Free School, Ixworth
SET Saxmundham School, Saxmundham
Sir John Leman High School, Beccles
Stoke High School, Maidenhall
Stour Valley Community School, Clare
Stowmarket High School, Stowmarket
Stowupland High School, Stowupland
Stradbroke High School, Stradbroke
Sybil Andrews Academy, Bury St Edmunds
Thomas Gainsborough School, Great Cornard
Thomas Mills High School, Framlingham
Thurston Community College, Thurston
Westbourne Academy, Ipswich

Special and alternative schools

The Albany, Bury St Edmunds
Alderwood Academy, Ipswich
Ashley School, Lowestoft
The Attic, Bungay
The Bridge School, Ipswich
Castle East School, Bungay
Chalk Hill, Sudbury
Churchill Special Free School, Haverhill
First Base, Bury St Edmunds
First Base, Ipswich
Hillside Special School, Sudbury
Horizon School, Bungay
Olive AP Academy Suffolk, Stowmarket
Parkside Academy, Ipswich
Priory School, Bury St Edmunds
Riverwalk School, Bury St Edmunds
St Christopher's Academy, Ipswich
Sir Bobby Robson School, Ipswich
Sir Peter Hall School, Bury St Edmunds
Stone Lodge Academy, Ipswich
Sunrise Academy, Carlton Colville
Thomas Wolsey Ormiston Academy, Ipswich
Warren School, Lowestoft
Westbridge Academy, Ipswich
Woodbridge Road Academy, Ipswich

Further education
Abbeygate Sixth Form College
Easton & Otley College
Lowestoft College
Lowestoft Sixth Form College
One
Suffolk New College
West Suffolk College

Independent schools

Primary and preparatory schools
Barnardiston Hall Preparatory School, Barnardiston
Fairstead House School, Newmarket
Old Buckenham Hall School, Brettenham
The Old School, Henstead
Orwell Park School, Nacton
South Lee School, Bury St Edmunds

Senior and all-through schools

Brookes UK, Risby
Culford School, Culford
Felixstowe International College, Felixstowe
Finborough School, Great Finborough
Framlingham College, Framlingham
Ipswich High School, Woolverstone
Ipswich School, Ipswich
The Meadows Montessori School, Ipswich
OneSchool Global UK, Stoke-by-Nayland
Royal Hospital School, Holbrook
Saint Felix School, Reydon
St Joseph's College, Ipswich
Stoke College, Stoke-by-Clare
Summerhill School, Leiston
Woodbridge School, Woodbridge

Special and alternative schools

Acorn Cottage The Lodge, Stowmarket
Bramfield House School, Bramfield
Broadlands Hall, Little Wratting
Cambian Dunbroch School, Newmarket
Catch 22 Include Primary School Suffolk, Ipswich
Centre Academy East Anglia, Brettenham
Compass Community School Aylward Park, Leiston
Gable End, Hitcham
Liberty Lodge Independent School, Ipswich
Ness Point School, Lowestoft
New Skill Centre, Ipswich
On Track Education Centre, Mildenhall
The Ryes College, Assington
Wetheringsett Manor School, Wetheringsett

References

External links
Secondary schools in Suffolk

 
Suffolk
Lists of buildings and structures in Suffolk